Sumukhi Suresh (born 18 October 1981) is an actor, stand-up comedian, writer and director from India. She is popularly known for her humorous sketches which she writes and stars in for live performances as well as online platforms. In an online article, Hindustan Times referred to Sumukhi Suresh as "India's Tina Fey." She has been a part of stand-up comedy shows like Comicstaan, Go Straight Take Left, Comedy premier League and her solo special, Don't Tell Amma. But she is best known for her funny yet twisted web series, 'Pushpavalli'. The stand-up comedian and actor turned entrepreneur by launching a content platform called 'Motormouth' which is especially for writers who are passionate about pitching stories for movies, web shows and more. She launched this company since she there is no time to complain and expect other people to create better characters or develop out of the box ideas. In a chat with 'Telangana Today', she concluded that one should attend many zoom shows and live shows to know if they are actually funny.

Early life
Sumukhi Suresh was raised in Nagpur, although her mother is from Tamil Nadu. She finished her graduation from M.O.P Vaishnav College for Women, Chennai. Suresh moved to Bengaluru in 2009 and started working at Hippocampus, a Children's Library. She then went on to work as a chef and was also employed at a food laboratory for a brief period of time.

In 2013, Sumukhi joined The Improv,
which was an improvisational comedy show in Bengaluru, while working at the laboratory. Along with the rest of the Improv team, Sumukhi performed in 100 shows in Bengaluru, Dubai, Mumbai, Hyderabad and Sweden. In 2015, she quit her full-time job to start a career in comedy.

Career
Sumukhi's first video was Anu Aunty- Engineering Anthem with Varun Agrawal. She then did the Maid Sketch with Sanjay Manaktala as the boisterous Parvati Bai. Sumukhi rose to fame after portraying the character of 'Sumukhi Chawla', an NGO employee, in India's first mockumentary-style YouTube series—Better Life Foundation. Sumukhi has performed comedy shows with Naveen Richard, the writer of the show Better Life Foundation. She also gained popularity for her property "Disgust Me" a by invite, women-only stand-up comedy show.

While talking about  improvisation skills in content creation, she said, "While acting comes to me in an easy manner, stand-up takes a lot more effort. I started my career with Improv and even now I carry improvisational skills into everything I do. As a matter of fact, when I work with Richard, we don’t write the dialogue first, rather we improv first."

After getting much appreciation for her role in Better Life Foundation, Sumukhi launched a video series called Behti Naak on her own YouTube channel. In the video series, she plays Behti Naak, a 10-year-old girl with a deadpan style of humour. The videos became viral.

Sumukhi was approached by Amazon Prime, India to make a web series. Pushpavalli, a semi-autobiagraphical series created by Sumukhi Suresh, was released on December 15 on Amazon Prime Video in India and received positive reviews. The show is directed by Debbie Rao and stars Naveen Richard, Manish Anand, Preetika Chawla and Shraddha. She said, " I'm glad Amazon did not impose on me that the show had to be in Hindi. Even if the streaming services have subtitles, a Hindi show does immensely well. But I didn't want that. I wanted an accurate representation of Bengaluru, where everyone knows at least three languages. I'm glad I could present South Indian people with all their quirks and ticks. I was also accused of representing every member of the community as flawed. But my defence was, 'Look at Nikhil [the man Pushpavalli falls in love with and moves city for]!' He's a Kannadiga, and he looks like a bloody flower." Naveen Richard pointed to 'Firstpost' that he connected with Sumukhi the most because of their 'South Indian backgrounds'.

Sumukhi was approached by Amazon Prime, India for a second time to make a one hour web show titled Don't tell Amma which since its release has received positive reviews. This was a recording show in Begumpet, Hyderabad. The show wittily describes the relationship between millennials and their Indian Mothers. Though the title says Don't tell Amma (Mother), interestingly enough, many people watched the show with their mothers.

Sumukhi, along with fellow comedian and absurdist Naveen Richard, co-created the Prime Video show Go Straight Take Left. The show is a compilation of six sketches.

In 2018, Sumukhi Suresh hosted the first season of Prime Video's web series Comicstaan alongside comedian Abish Mathew. She was a part of the judges' panel for the second season of the same show with Urooj Ashfaq replacing her as host.

Sumukhi has acted in Humble Politician Nograj, a 2018 Kannada film. She plays the role of Lavanya, wife of Nograj (Danish Sait). This film is a political satire.

In a conversation with newsX she said that comedy industry is still peaking and hence it is still a community rather than an industry. She also feels that for comedy,  social media and live shows are equally important and cannot replace each other.

Stand on feminism
In India, where stand-up comedy shows are generally dominated by men, In August 2018,  Sumukhi narrated a  masturbation manual for women and emancipation prominently featured the name of Hrithik Roshan as an object of female fantasy. Sumukhi is known as one of the very few successful female stand-up comedians.

However, Sumukhi has spoken against the tag. In an interview with Verve magazine, she was quoted as saying,
She launched the content platform 'Motormouth' with an aim to create more space for female entertainers. She also said, "when I am saying 'voice', it does not have to be a protest or social messaging all the time; it can just be fun!

While talking about her vision for 'Motormouth' she says , "If we wish to change the narrative then we need to be in positions of power. I want to change culture by creating more female protagonists. I want to tell stories with real, flawed characters who are not just hot and sexy, sati Savitri, vamp, or any one of these things. Real women, and people in general are a hundred things at the same time at any given point and I want our content to reflect that." Although she feels responsible for explaining, educating and clearing the misunderstandings about feminism, she also thinks it is important to distinguish feminism from privilege. She said, "There are a lot of things female comedians must ask themselves before crying sexism."

Filmfare winner Sumukhi Suresh said,"I want the people who see me, especially the girls, to think, ‘I need to have confidence like her’, because I wanted to see someone like that when I was young."

Filmography

Awards and nominations

References 

1987 births
Indian stand-up comedians
Living people
People from Nagpur